Bogan River, a perennial river that is part of the Macquarie–Barwon catchment within the Murray–Darling basin, is located in the central west and Orana regions of New South Wales, Australia.

The name Bogan is supposedly an Australian Aboriginal (Wiradjuri or Ngiyambaa) term meaning 'the birthplace of a notable headman of the local tribe'; and is also a Gaelic term meaning bog.

Geography
The river flows in a generally north-north-westerly direction past Tottenham, Peak Hill and through Nyngan. East of Bourke, the Bogan River joins with the Little Bogan River to form the Darling River. The Bogan River has over twenty tributaries. The main tributaries to the west are Bullock, Bulbodney, Pangee and Whitbarrow Creeks. The eastern catchment between the Bogan and Macquarie Rivers is ill-defined and has only one major tributary, Mulla Cowal. Other sources have claimed that Bugwah Cowal, and Burrill, Duck and Gunningbar Creeks are important tributaries.

Unlike the other main rivers of inland New South Wales, the Bogan does not rise in the well-watered highland areas, so its flow is low and erratic and not much use for irrigation.

Major weirs along the watercourse are at Muddal Weir, located west of Peak Hill; the Nyngan Weir, located north of Nyngan; and Gongolgon Weir, where the mean daily flow exceeds .

History

Aboriginal history
A number of Aboriginal peoples lived in the lands surrounding the Bogan River for many thousands of years. In the area surrounding Peak Hill, the indigenous inhabitants of the area were the Wiradjuri clan. In the area surrounding Nyngan, the Ngiyambaa Aboriginal people were the principal custodians of the land.

European history
The river was crossed by John Oxley in 1817, but was named by Charles Sturt in his 1828-9 expedition as New Years Creek on 1 January 1829. It was also called the Bogan River prior to Major Sir Thomas Mitchell reaching here in 1835. On 17 April 1835 Richard Cunningham wandered away from the Mitchell party near the Bogan River and it is believed that he was killed here by Aborigines.

The Albert Priest Channel was built in 1941 and this assists the water supplies of Nyngan and Cobar with Macquarie River water. It is about 60 km long, extending from Gunningbar Creek near Warren to the Bogan River upstream of Nyngan. A pipeline takes water from Nyngan to Cobar.

In April 1990, major flooding occurred along the river and in Nyngan, and despite a massive effort by local people to build levee walls using sandbags, 2,500 people had to be evacuated from the town. The floods caused A$50 million damage.  Other significant flooding of the Bogan River occurred in 1928, 1950, 1989 and other years. In 1989 the significant flooding was downstream of Nyngan. https://trove.nla.gov.au/newspaper/article/63179773

See also

 Rivers of New South Wales

References

External links
 Macquarie-Bogan River: NSW Water Quality and River Flow Objectives at the NSW Office of Environment and Heritage. 2006. 
 Images of the Bogan River at the State Library of New South Wales.
 

Tributaries of the Darling River